Reader Rabbit's Interactive Reading Journey is a 1994 video game released on the Windows and Macintosh systems. It is the sixth game in the Reader Rabbit franchise. Designed for ages 4 till 7, the game introduces the new main characters Mat the Mouse and Sam the Lion who accompany Reader. It was then re-released in 1997 under the title "Reader Rabbit's Interactive Reading Journey For Grades K-1", followed by another in 1998 titled "Reader Rabbit's Reading Ages 4–6" and a personalized version in 1999.

Educational goals
The game teaches users how to read effectively. Forty storybooks can be read aloud or narrated to the user. Over 100 reading exercises include phonics, word-recognition, spelling skills and building vocabulary. The activities incorporate repetition of words, followed by a gradual increase of word variety. The game challenges users to keep learning independently and helps them to become interested in reading. It also allows older users to build up on their previous skills. Overall, "Reading Journey" allows learners to set their reading progress at their own page. The game came packaged with printed versions of 40 stories included in the game, which aid in reading along at the computer or independent reading away from the computer.

Reception

CD-ROM Today rated the game 5 stars, meriting its simple interface and artistic design.

PC Magazine wrote that the game facilitates learning in a non-threatening and effective way. Creating Ever-cool noted that as the difficulty increases with each book, readers feel a "thrill of accomplishment" upon progressing. Working Mother praised the title's "creative approach". The Washington Post praised the animation as "crisp and humorous". The Parents Magazine declared that the game was the most comprehensive reading skill software of that time.

In June 1997, Interactive Reading Journey Learning and Interactive Reading Journey 2 were the 5th and 6th best selling reading titles.

References

External links
 

1994 video games
The Learning Company games
Children's educational video games
Software for children
Reader Rabbit
Windows games
Classic Mac OS games
Video games developed in the United States
Single-player video games